In mathematics, the Mathai–Quillen formalism is an approach to topological quantum field theory introduced by ,  based on the Mathai–Quillen form constructed in . In more detail, using the superconnection formalism of Quillen, they obtained a refinement of the Riemann–Roch formula, which links together the Thom classes in K-theory and cohomology, as an equality on the level of differential forms. This has an interpretation in physics as the computation of the classical and quantum (super) partition functions for the fermionic analogue of a harmonic oscillator with source term. In particular, they obtained a nice Gaussian shape representative of the Thom class in cohomology, which has a peak along the zero section.

References

Algebraic topology